Elisabeth Judson Shue (born October 6, 1963) is an American actress. She is best known for her roles in the films The Karate Kid (1984), Adventures in Babysitting (1987), Cocktail (1988), Back to the Future Part II (1989), Back to the Future Part III (1990), Soapdish (1991), The Saint (1997), Hollow Man (2000), Heart and Souls, Palmetto Piranha 3D (2010), Battle of the Sexes (2017), Death Wish (2018), Greyhound (2020), and Cobra Kai (2021). She was nominated for an Academy Award, a British Academy Film Award, a Golden Globe Award, and a Screen Actors Guild Award for her role in the film Leaving Las Vegas (1995).

On television, she has starred as Julie Finlay in the CBS procedural forensics crime drama CSI: Crime Scene Investigation from 2012 to 2015, Madelyn Stillwell in the Amazon Prime Video series The Boys and The Boys Presents: Diabolical, and reprised her The Karate Kid role in the third season of Cobra Kai. She currently stars as "Anne" in the Netflix dramedy series On the Verge.

Early life and education
Shue was born on October 6, 1963, in Wilmington, Delaware, the daughter of Anne Brewster (née Wells), and James William Shue, a one-time congressional candidate, lawyer, and real estate developer, who was president of the International Food and Beverage Corporation. Her mother was a vice president in the private banking division of the Chemical Bank Corporation. 

She grew up in South Orange, New Jersey. Her parents divorced when she was nine. Shue's mother is a descendant of Pilgrim leader William Brewster, while her father's family emigrated from Germany to Pennsylvania in the early 19th century. Shue was raised with her three brothers (William, Andrew and John) and was very close to them. Her younger brother, Andrew, is also an actor, best known for his role as Billy Campbell in the Fox series Melrose Place. Shue graduated from Columbia High School, in 1981 in Maplewood, New Jersey, where she and Andrew were inducted into the school's Hall of Fame in 1994. She has two half-siblings from her father's remarriage, Jenna and Harvey Shue.

After graduating from high school, Shue attended Wellesley College. She then transferred to Harvard University in 1985, from which she withdrew to pursue her acting career (she was inspired by a friend to work in television commercials as a way to pay for college) one semester short of earning her degree. Over a decade later, in 2000, she returned to Harvard and completed her B.A. in political science.

Career

1980s and early 1990s
During her studies at Columbia High School and after her parents' divorce, Shue began acting in television commercials, becoming a common sight in advertisements for Burger King, also featuring future stars Sarah Michelle Gellar and Lea Thompson (whom Elisabeth would later co-star with in both television and film), DeBeers diamonds, Chewels bubble gum, and Best Foods/Hellmann's mayonnaise.

Shue made her feature film debut in 1984, when she co-starred opposite Ralph Macchio in The Karate Kid as Ali Mills, a high school cheerleader and the love interest of Macchio's main character. She was a series regular as the teenage daughter of a military family in the short-lived television series Call to Glory between 1984 and 1985, which she followed in 1986 starring alongside Terence Stamp in the British horror film Link. In 1987 Shue appeared in the television movie Double Switch (part of the Disney Sunday Movie series), co-starring with George Newbern, who would go on to support her in her first star vehicle, the hugely popular Adventures in Babysitting, in the same year.

In 1988, Shue starred in Cocktail as the love interest of Tom Cruise's lead character. The following year she starred in the short film Body Wars, which was used at Epcot in an ATLAS Simulator attraction in the Wonders Of Life Pavilion until 2007. Other roles followed, including appearing as Jennifer Parker in Back to the Future Part II (1989) and Back to the Future Part III (1990), where she replaced Claudia Wells who declined to reprise the role from Back to the Future because of a family illness. It was around this time her older brother, William, died in an accident on a family holiday. Although her career was on the rise with her playing lead roles, Shue elected to take on the smaller supporting role of Jennifer in these sequels to allow her to deal with her family loss. The sequels were filmed back to back, and she featured prominently in Part II, appearing in bookend pieces in the third part of the trilogy.

She auditioned for the Ione Skye role in Say Anything... (1989), being a runner-up along with Jennifer Connelly.
 
In May 1990, Shue made her Broadway debut in Some American Abroad at the Lincoln Center. The following year she returned to cinema where she appeared in the comedies The Marrying Man with Kim Basinger and Alec Baldwin, and Soapdish with Sally Field, Robert Downey Jr., Kevin Kline, and Whoopi Goldberg.

Between 1992 and 1994 she appeared in a variety of supporting roles in both film and television. These included the comedy Twenty Bucks (reuniting with Christopher Lloyd from Back to the Future), noir thriller The Underneath, a guest appearance in Dream On, and the romantic comedy Heart and Souls (reuniting with Robert Downey Jr.). She also returned to Broadway in 1993, performing in Tina Howe's production of Birth and After Birth.

1995–present
Although often cast as a girl-next-door type, in a career-defining role she starred as a prostitute in the 1995 film Leaving Las Vegas with Nicolas Cage. The role earned her an Academy Award nomination for Best Actress. She was also nominated for a BAFTA, Golden Globe and SAG Award for Best Actress, and won Best Actress at the Independent Spirit Awards, Los Angeles Film Critics Association Awards and the National Society of Film Critics Awards.

Her career flourished after her Oscar nomination, landing her diverse roles. She starred in The Trigger Effect in 1996. Woody Allen's Deconstructing Harry (1996) showcased her comedic abilities amongst heavyweight co-stars Billy Crystal, Demi Moore, Robin Williams and Stanley Tucci. Shue also displayed some action movie skills in the 1997 spy remake The Saint opposite Val Kilmer. The thriller Palmetto (1998) afforded her the chance to play a film noir-ish femme fatale opposite Woody Harrelson; she co-starred in Cousin Bette (1998) with Jessica Lange, and Paul Verhoeven's Hollow Man (2000) with Kevin Bacon proved another summer blockbuster.

In 1999, Shue starred as the titular Molly as an autistic young woman placed into the care of her unwilling bachelor brother, played by Aaron Eckhart. She played a mother that reveals her dark past to her teenaged daughter in the 2001 ABC movie Oprah Winfrey Presents: Amy and Isabelle. She has since stated she was "extremely proud of that film, which no one ever saw, so it's a good lesson that you do work for yourself and not necessarily for the end result".

Shue starred in Leo (2002) with Joseph Fiennes and Dennis Hopper, Mysterious Skin (2004) opposite Joseph Gordon-Levitt, Hide and Seek (2005) opposite Robert De Niro and Dakota Fanning, and Dreamer (2005) again opposite Dakota Fanning and Kurt Russell.

In 2007, Shue and her two brothers, Andrew Shue and John Shue, produced Gracie. Her husband Davis Guggenheim also produced and directed. She played the mother of the main character who was loosely based on her own experiences as the only girl on a boys' soccer team. Andrew also appeared as the soccer coach, and her previous co-star from The Trigger Effect Dermot Mulroney played the father of the main character. Andrew Shue initially conceived of it as a story about their late brother William, the oldest Shue sibling, who was the captain of the high school soccer team; he died in a freak accident while the family was on a vacation in 1988. The older brother character of Johnny was based on Will. She also starred in the little seen First Born (2007) with British actor Steven Mackintosh.

In 2008, Shue starred in Hamlet 2 as a fictionalized version of herself. In the film, she has quit acting to become a nurse and is the favorite actress of Dana Marschz (Steve Coogan). In 2009, Shue appeared on the seventh season of HBO's Curb Your Enthusiasm as an actress competing with Cheryl Hines's character for the part of George's ex-wife for the Seinfeld reunion. In 2009 she starred alongside Thomas Haden Church in Don McKay.

In 2010, Shue starred in Piranha 3D as Sheriff Julie Forester. In addition she played the former groupie mother of Abigail Breslin in Janie Jones and a psychologist in Waking Madison alongside Sarah Roemer and Imogen Poots.

In 2012, Shue appeared in three wide-release theatrical films: the thriller House at the End of the Street with Jennifer Lawrence; Curtis Hanson's Chasing Mavericks opposite Gerard Butler; and David Frankel's Hope Springs as Karen the bartender in a cameo scene with Meryl Streep.

The year 2012 also marked Shue's return to television in a series regular role when she joined the cast of Season 12's CSI: Crime Scene Investigation as Julie Finlay opposite Ted Danson, and replacing Marg Helgenberger. Finlay is the newest CSI, who just finished anger-management classes. She continued in the role until the end of Season 15 where her character's fate was left hanging in the balance, later revealed in the two-part 2015 TV movie wrap-up finale of the entire series to have died (Shue did not appear). During her time on the series, being a massive tennis fan as well as regular tennis player, she jokingly suggested to the producers they have an episode centered around a murder at a tennis tournament. In Season 13 her wish was granted, and her friends and former pros-turned commentators, 18-time Grand Slam champion Chris Evert, three-time Grand Slam winner Lindsay Davenport and two-time mixed doubles Slam champ Justin Gimelstob appeared in an episode as themselves. She also re-united with Back to the Future alumna Lea Thompson, who guest starred in an episode of Season 14.

In 2014 she appeared as a cougar in Behaving Badly along with Selena Gomez, Nat Wolff and Heather Graham. In 2015 she guest-starred in an episode of the Patrick Stewart series Blunt Talk.

In 2017, she provided a strong supporting role in Battle of the Sexes, opposite Steve Carell and Emma Stone. She had originally signed on as a tennis adviser for the film which recounts the 1973 showdown between female player Billie Jean King and former men's champ Bobby Riggs.

In 2018 she co-starred in Eli Roth's remake of Death Wish opposite Bruce Willis as his ill-fated wife. In the movie, Shue was also re-united with Vincent D'Onofrio, who appeared in Adventures in Babysitting with her.

In 2019, Shue took a leading role in the American superhero drama television series, The Boys, with Karl Urban and Jack Quaid, and will be playing the lead role in the TNT television pilot Constance, playing a corrupt former beauty queen. In the latter she will also be one of the executive producers along with Robert Downey Jr. (whom she previously co-starred with in Soapdish and Heart and Souls) and his wife Susan Downey among others. Constance is not going forward to series so remains to be seen if the pilot will air as a television movie.

Shue starred in Greyhound opposite Tom Hanks, released in 2020. In the same year, Shue reprised her Karate Kid role as Ali Mills for a guest appearance in the sequel series, Cobra Kai, alongside her original co-stars Ralph Macchio and William Zabka.

Personal life
Shue married film director Davis Guggenheim in 1994. The couple have three children: Miles William, Stella Street, and Agnes Charles.

Filmography

Film

Television

Theme parks

Awards and nominations

References

External links

 

 
 
 

1963 births
Living people
20th-century American actresses
21st-century American actresses
Actresses from New Jersey
Actresses from Wilmington, Delaware
American film actresses
American television actresses
American people of English descent
American people of German descent
Columbia High School (New Jersey) alumni
Harvard University alumni
Independent Spirit Award for Best Female Lead winners
People from South Orange, New Jersey